The 1994 Los Angeles Dodgers season was the 105th for the franchise in Major League Baseball and their 37th season in Los Angeles, California.

The Dodgers were leading the National League Western Division  when the players strike halted the season in August.

Offseason
November 17, 1993: Acquired Delino DeShields from the Montreal Expos for Pedro Martínez
December 27, 1993: Acquired Ron Coomer from the Chicago White Sox for Isidro Márquez
March 28, 1994: Acquired Al Osuna from the Houston Astros for James Daspit

Regular season

The Dodgers had compiled a 58-56 record through 114 games by Friday, August 12. They had scored 532 runs (4.67 per game) and allowed 509 runs (4.46 per game).

Season standings

Record vs. opponents

Opening Day lineup

Notable transactions

June 16, 1994: Acquired Brian Barnes from the Cleveland Indians for Eddie Lantigua

Roster

Starting Pitchers stats
Note: G = Games pitched; GS = Games started; IP = Innings pitched; W/L = Wins/Losses; ERA = Earned run average; BB = Walks allowed; SO = Strikeouts; CG = Complete games

Relief Pitchers stats
Note: G = Games pitched; GS = Games started; IP = Innings pitched; W/L = Wins/Losses; ERA = Earned run average; BB = Walks allowed; SO = Strikeouts; SV = Saves

Batting Stats
Note: Pos = Position; G = Games played; AB = At bats; Avg. = Batting average; R = Runs scored; H = Hits; HR = Home runs; RBI = Runs batted in; SB = Stolen bases

1994 Awards
1994 Major League Baseball All-Star Game
Mike Piazza starter
Rookie of the Year Award
 Raúl Mondesí
Comeback Player of the Year
Tim Wallach
Baseball Digest Rookie All-Star
Raúl Mondesí
Players Choice: NL Outstanding Rookie
Raúl Mondesí
Silver Slugger Award
Mike Piazza
TSN NL Rookie of the Year
Raúl Mondesí
TSN National League All-Star
Mike Piazza
NL Player of the Month
Mike Piazza (May 1994)
NL Player of the Week
Mike Piazza (May 16–22)

Farm system 

Teams in BOLD won League Championships

Major League Baseball Draft

The Dodgers selected 77 players in this draft. Of those, 13 of them would eventually play Major League baseball.

The first round draft pick was Paul Konerko, a catcher from Chaparral High School in Scottsdale, Arizona. He was quickly converted to first base and made his Dodgers debut in 1997. He was traded the following year to the Cincinnati Reds and then in 1999 to the Chicago White Sox, where he became a six time All-Star and was the 2005 ALCS MVP as the White Sox won the 2005 World Series. In 18 seasons, he hit .279 with 439 home runs and 1,412 RBI in 2,349 games.

References

External links 
1994 Los Angeles Dodgers uniform
Los Angeles Dodgers official web site
Baseball-Reference season page
Baseball Almanac season page

Los Angeles Dodgers seasons
Los Angeles Dodgers
1994 in sports in California